Hogwarts Express is a fictional train in J.K. Rowling's Harry Potter series.

Hogqarts Express may also refer to:
 Hogwarts Express (Universal Orlando Resort), an attraction within the Universal Orlando Resort in Orlando, Florida